The Hotel Employees and Restaurant Employees Union (HERE) was a United States labor union representing workers of the hospitality industry, formed in 1890. In 2004, HERE merged with the Union of Needletrades, Industrial, and Textile Employees (UNITE) to form UNITE HERE. HERE notably organized the staff of Yale University in 1984. Other major employers that contracted with this union included Harrah's, Caesars Palace, Wynn Resorts, Hilton Hotels, Hyatt, and Walt Disney World. HERE was affiliated with the AFL–CIO.

Female participation and leadership
Female membership in HERE grew from 2,000 in 1908 to 181,000 in 1950. The rise in women membership reflected the feminization of the hotel and restaurant industry and the increase in the performance of waiting work by women. Women's presence in leadership positions of HERE also increased. Waitress activists sat on the General Executive Board (GEB) from 1909 on and participated in various conventions, though as a minority status. Participation was highest in the 1920s. Though female participation in HERE dipped in the 1930s and 1940s, it was still disproportionately higher than in other unions.

Women also enjoyed leadership positions at the local level. A national estimation written in 1926 held that 43 culinary locals had female secretaries; in 1944 California, 21 out of 75 locals had female secretaries, a prominent position in labor organizing. Women were able to enjoy such success in HERE due to the separation of workers by trade, which provided waitress activists "space apart from male hostility and … the development of female perspectives and leadership skills."

Archives
The Kheel Center for Labor-Management Documentation and Archives, Martin P. Catherwood Library at Cornell University holds numerous collections of archival material generated by HERE at a national level.

The Walter P. Reuther Library at Wayne State University in Detroit, Michigan houses an archival collection detailing the history of HERE Local 24 from 1914 to 1976, including numerous photographs.

The UCLA Library Department of Special Collections holds the records of UNITE HERE Local 11, which includes records of HERE locals in Los Angeles, Santa Monica, and Long Beach, California.

Presidents
1893: John Mee
1894:
1899: Joseph R. Michaels
1902: Robert A. Callahan
1904: T. J. Sullivan
1911: Edward Flore
1945: Hugo Ernst
1954: Ed Miller
1973: Edward T. Hanley
1998: John W. Wilhelm

Footnotes

Further reading
 Shaun Richman, "Ideology vs. 'Rule or Ruin' Politics in the Downfall of the Communists in the NYC Hotel and Restaurant Employees Union, 1934-1952," American Communist History, vol. 11, no. 3 (Dec. 2012), pp. 243–264.
 Matthew Josephson, Union house, union bar; the history of the Hotel and Restaurant Employees and Bartenders International Union, AFL–CIO (New York: Random House, 1956).
 Dorothy Sue Cobble, "Organizing the Postindustrial Work Force: Lessons from the History of Waitress Unionism," Industrial and Labor Relations Review (April 1991): 419–436.

UNITE HERE
Defunct trade unions in the United States
Canadian Labour Congress
Women's occupational organizations
Hospitality industry trade unions
1891 establishments in the United States
Trade unions established in 1891
Trade unions disestablished in 2004